Avehza (also Romanized as Āvehzā; also known as Ābzā) is a village in Arkavazi Rural District, Chavar District, Ilam County, Ilam Province, Iran. At the 2006 census, its population was 322, in 60 families. The village is populated by Kurds.

References 

Populated places in Ilam County
Kurdish settlements in Ilam Province